Kaboul Kitchen is a French comedy television series broadcast by Canal+. It was created by Marc Victor, Allan Mauduit and Jean-Patrick Benes. The series is based on the true story of Radio France Internationale journalist Marc Victor, who ran a restaurant for French expatriates in Kabul until 2008. The first series premiered on February 15, 2012, on Canal+ and ended on March 5, 2012. It set a ratings record for comedy series in the primetime slot on Canal+. A second series of 12 episodes aired in France in 2014.

The series depicts the life of French expatriate Jacky who runs the popular restaurant Kaboul Kitchen in Kabul, Afghanistan. His daughter Sophie, who he has not seen in 20 years, arrives to do humanitarian work, while he is interested in keeping the restaurant afloat with challenges of local officials, Taliban neighbors, and more.

The series won two Golden FIPA Awards at the 2012 Festival International de Programmes Audiovisuels: one for Best TV Series and one for Best TV Screenplay. It was screened at MIPTV and named fourth on The Hollywood Reporter's list of "MIPTV A-List Projects" for the most promising series screened at the event.

Cast
 Gilbert Melki as Jacky
  as Sophie
 Benjamin Bellecour as Axel
 Alexis Michalik as Damien
 Simon Abkarian as Colonel Amanullah
 Marc Citti as Victor
 Braham Bihi as Sayed
 Nadia Niazi as Hamida
 Fayçal Azizi as Habib
 Fanny Touron as Camille
 Jonas Senhadji as Carl
 Lucia Sanchez as Rosemary
 Serge Dupire as Bob
 Louis-Do de Lencquesaing as Paul Braque

Production
The series is loosely based on the real life experiences of journalist and co-creator of the series, Marc Victor. From 2003 to 2008, Victor ran a French restaurant for foreign NGO workers in Kabul. Although much in the series is for dramatic effect, a few incidents, such as a wealthy donor sending skis to Afghanistan, really happened.

Gilbert Melki was selected to play the mercenary Jacky as he had evenly divided his career between comedy and drama films, a quality creator Allan Mauduit found desirable. The series was filmed mainly in Casablanca, Morocco where the crew had to use dust machines to simulate the dusty conditions of Kabul. The actors studied Dari with language coaches.

A third season was broadcast in France in 2017. It has not been translated into English yet but is detailed on the french wikipedia page https://fr.wikipedia.org/wiki/Kaboul_Kitchen

A fourth season has been claimed to be in production.

Episode list

Series 1

Ratings

Awards
 2012 Golden FIPA Award for the Best TV Series at the Festival International de Programmes Audiovisuels
 2012 Golden FIPA Award for the Best TV Screenplay at the Festival International de Programmes Audiovisuels
 2014 Grand prize (Daesang) at the Seoul International Drama Awards

References

External links

French television sitcoms
2012 French television series debuts
Canal+ original programming